The San Joaquins is a passenger train service operated by Amtrak in California's San Joaquin Valley. Six daily round trips run between its southern terminus at Bakersfield and Stockton, with onward service to Sacramento (one round trip) and Oakland (five round trips).

The San Joaquins service is unique in the state and nation because of its extensive network of dedicated Amtrak Thruway bus routes that are critical to the performance of the service. Over 55% of passengers on the service use one of these bus routes during part of their trip. Amtrak Thruway routes are timed to meet trains and offer connections to points in Southern California (including Los Angeles Union Station where passengers can continue their journey on the Pacific Surfliner or Amtrak's long-distance trains), the city of San Francisco, the Central Coast, the North Coast, the High Desert (including Las Vegas), Redding, Reno, and the Yosemite Valley.

The San Joaquins is Amtrak's seventh-busiest service in the nation and the railroad's third-busiest in the state of California. During fiscal year 2019, the service carried 1,071,190 passengers, a 0.7% decrease from the prior year.

Like all regional trains in California, the San Joaquins service is operated by a joint powers authority. The San Joaquin Joint Powers Authority (SJJPA) is governed by a board that includes two elected representatives from each of eight counties the train travels through. The SJJPA contracts with the San Joaquin Regional Rail Commission to provide day-to-day management of the service and contracts with Amtrak to operate the service and maintain the rolling stock (locomotives and passenger cars). The California Department of Transportation (Caltrans) provides the funding to operate the service and also owns the rolling stock.

History

Golden Gate/San Joaquin Daylight

The San Joaquins service runs over lines that once hosted several passenger trains a day. The top trains were the Golden Gate on the Atchison, Topeka and Santa Fe Railway (predecessor to BNSF), and the San Joaquin Daylight on the Southern Pacific Railroad (later acquired by Union Pacific). Prior to 1960s service cutbacks passenger service continued south of Bakersfield, to Glendale and Los Angeles.

In April 1965, as ridership on passenger trains continued to drop, the Santa Fe Railway received permission from the Interstate Commerce Commission to severely curtail Golden Gate operations, with service finally abandoned three years later. The San Joaquin Daylight was discontinued with the start-up of Amtrak in May 1971.

Other passenger trains that ran through the Central Valley included Southern Pacific's Owl and Santa Fe's San Francisco Chief and Valley Flyer.

Amtrak era

Amtrak routed all Los Angeles-San Francisco service over the Southern Pacific's Coast Line in its initial 1971 route structure, leaving the San Joaquin Valley without service. Both the Southern Pacific's San Joaquin Daylight and the Santa Fe's San Francisco Chief had served the region. Beginning in 1972 Amtrak revisited the decision at the urging of area congressmen, notably Bernice F. Sisk, who favored service between Oakland and Barstow or, failing that, Barstow and Sacramento. The first run was on March 5, 1974 — revenue service began the following day with one daily round-trip between Bakersfield and Oakland and bus connections from Bakersfield to Los Angeles and Oakland to San Francisco. The San Joaquin could not continue south of Bakersfield due to capacity limits over the Tehachapi Loop, the only line between Bakersfield and points south and one of the world's busiest single-track freight rail lines. Amtrak chose the Santa Fe route over the Southern Pacific, citing the higher speed of the Santa Fe –  versus  – and freight congestion on the Southern Pacific. The decision was not without controversy, with Sisk alleging that the Southern Pacific lobbied the Nixon Administration to influence the decision.

Madera station and Richmond station were added on October 30, 1977, along with a Stockton–Sacramento connecting bus. The schedule was changed on July 19, 1979, with an earlier northbound and later southbound departure, allowing single-day round trips to the Bay Area.

Caltrans era

In 1979 Amtrak proposed discontinuing the San Joaquin as part of system-wide reductions ordered by the Carter Administration. The state of California stepped in to provide a yearly subsidy of (then) $700,000 ($ adjusted for inflation) to cover the train's operating losses, and it was retained. At the time the state asked Amtrak to add a second round trip between Oakland and Bakersfield, and to extend the service south over the Tehachapi Pass to Los Angeles. Amtrak added the second train in February 1980, but attempts to extend the train over the Tehachapi Loop failed due to Southern Pacific's opposition.

A third round trip was added on December 17, 1989. Two days later, southbound San Joaquin train 708 collided with a tractor-trailer rig at a crossing east of Stockton on Mariposa Road, killing the driver of the rig and two Amtrak engineers. A fourth round trip was added on October 25, 1992. On May 16, 1999, Amtrak added a Sacramento–Bakersfield round trip - the fifth daily San Joaquins service round trip. A second Sacramento–Bakersfield round trip was added on March 18, 2002.

Transfer to local control

Expansion of the service would stagnate after 2002, and 10 years later, frustrated by what was perceived to be Caltrans’ slow response to regional concerns, local leaders pushed lawmakers to allow local control of the San Joaquins service.  On September 29, 2012, Governor Jerry Brown signed Assembly Bill 1779, which enabled regional government agencies to form the San Joaquin Joint Powers Authority (SJJPA) to assume administration and management of the route, while the state of California would continue to fund operations. Under the joint powers authority model, the service would be governed by a board composed of eight elected officials, appointed by an agency in each of the counties the train travels through. The governance structure was modeled after the Capitol Corridor Joint Powers Authority, which has been operating the Capitol Corridor regional train in Northern California since 1998.

The first SJJPA Board meeting was held on March 22, 2013, to begin planning for the shift in control. In that time, the SJJPA board contracted with the San Joaquin Regional Rail Commission to provide day-to-day management of the service and contracted with Amtrak to continue to operate the service and maintain the rolling stock (locomotives and passenger cars). Control of the train service shifted from Caltrans to the SJJPA on July 1, 2015.

A fifth Oakland–Bakersfield round trip was added to the service on June 20, 2016, the first expansion of the service in more than 14 years.

Two years later, the SJJPA established an early-morning "Morning Express Service" between Fresno and Sacramento, allowing same-day trips to the state capitol for the first time, was expected to result in increased ridership from business travelers. The change was criticized by Bakersfield-area officials, because it required ending the last southbound train of the day in Fresno, reduced daily service to Bakersfield by one daily round trip. The service began on May 7, 2018, but proved to be unpopular, with ridership counts showing an average of just 50 people on the train, compared to 130 with the old timetable. The "Morning Express Service" was eliminated one year later on May 6, 2019, and trains were reverted to their previous schedule.

Sacramento service was discontinued and one round-trip to Oakland was cancelled on March 25, 2020, amid the COVID-19 pandemic. The cancelled Oakland trip was reinstated on June 28, 2021.

Planned expansion

 the agency is increasing capacity on its routes to avoid conflicts with freight trains and add additional trips as well as plan for connections to the California High-Speed Rail system. The level junction in Stockton where the two San Joaquin routes divert was the busiest rail junction in the state by 2019 – the north-south Union Pacific line is planned to be elevated over the BNSF line. Two additional Sacramento round trips are planned to be added, routed over the Union Pacific Railroad Sacramento Subdivision north of Stockton. Unlike the 1999-initiated route on the Fresno Subdivision, the Sacramento Subdivision has spare capacity to allow the increased service. Six new stations are planned: Lodi (separate from the Lodi Transit Station), Elk Grove, three locations in Sacramento, and Natomas. The Sacramento Subdivision trains will not serve the existing Sacramento Valley Station, but RT Light Rail connections and a shuttle bus to Sacramento International Airport are planned elsewhere. These improvements are being done in cooperation with Altamont Corridor Express (ACE), which will share the route to Natomas from Stockton and add an additional branch south to Ceres in 2023 with an extension to Merced in 2027. When the Natomas runs are initiated, one existing Oakland trip is planned to terminate at Stockton-Downtown, freeing a slot for a full Natomas to Bakersfield round-trip while continuing to provide five trips from the Bay Area.

The San Joaquin Joint Powers Authority will serve as the high-speed rail service provider in the Valley per a memorandum of understanding with the California High-Speed Rail Authority. Upon completion of the high-speed rail initial operating segment, some trains are expected to terminate at that system's new Merced station to act as a feeder to high-speed service. A new rail link is planned to run between the BNSF line currently used and the Union Pacific subdivision on which that station is planned in order to facilitate trips and transfers. Sacramento to Merced service is thus planned to increase in frequency to hourly service. At that point, BNSF train slots previously used for runs between Merced and Bakersfield could be retained as shuttle services to supplement high-speed services.

, Oakland to Bakersfield trips take just over six hours, which requires an expensive crew change in Merced. Longer-term proposals include extending Oakland trains to Oakland Coliseum station to provide service to Oakland International Airport and a second BART connection; routing some trains via the ACE route through the Tri-Valley; consolidating all Stockton service at Robert J. Cabral Station; and extensions to Marysville/Yuba City, Oroville, or Redding. The SJJPA ultimately plans to increase Sacramento service to hourly headways.

Route

The San Joaquins service runs from Bakersfield's Truxtun Avenue station northward on BNSF Railway's Mojave Subdivision within Bakersfield, the Bakersfield Subdivision from Bakersfield to Calwa (Fresno), then on the Stockton Subdivision from Calwa to Stockton.

At the Stockton Diamond the routes split to Oakland or Sacramento.

The Oakland trains continue west on the Stockton Subdivision to Port Chicago. At Port Chicago they cross to the Union Pacific Railroad's Tracy Subdivision to Martinez, continue on the Martinez Subdivision to Emeryville, and finally travel a few miles on the Niles Subdivision to Oakland's Jack London Square station.

Trains to the Sacramento Valley Station diverge in Stockton and run north to Sacramento on Union Pacific's Fresno Subdivision and on the Martinez Subdivision within Sacramento.

If the tracks for the Central Valley segment of California High-Speed Rail (HSR) are completed prior to that system's full startup, there are calls for the San Joaquins trains to use the HSR infrastructure to speed up traditional rail service to 125 mph.

The route is Amtrak's seventh-busiest service in the nation and the railroad's third-busiest in the state of California.

Stations and connections 
The San Joaquins service has an extensive network of dedicated Amtrak Thruway buses. Over 55% of passengers on the route used an Amtrak Thruway bus on at least one end of their trip.

Rolling stock
For its first two years of operation, the San Joaquin used single-level coaches Amtrak had inherited from other railroads. In October 1976 Amtrak introduced new Amfleet coaches to the service. From 1987 to 1989 Amtrak used Superliner and ex-ATSF Hi-Level coaches. For a short period beginning on June 15, 1987, this included a full dining car on one of the trains. Amtrak reequipped the San Joaquin trains again in 1989, this time with new Horizon coaches, when service expanded to three daily round-trips. The San Joaquin began receiving the Superliner-derived California Cars that it uses today in 1995.

Locomotives

Amtrak California operates its own fleet of EMD F59PHI, GE P32-8WH and Siemens Charger locomotives that are used on San Joaquins service trains. These locomotives are owned by Caltrans and carry its CDTX reporting marks. Amtrak owned locomotives are also occasionally used on the San Joaquin, including the P42DC.

California Car bi-level trainsets

The San Joaquins service is equipped with Amtrak California's fleet of California Car bi-level, high-capacity passenger cars owned by the California Department of Transportation (Caltrans). Each trainset typically consists of two coach cars, a coach/baggage car, a café (food-service) car, and a cab/coach car. The cab/coach car is similar to other coaches but with an engineer's operating cab and headlights on one end, allowing the train to be operated in push-pull mode, which eliminates the need to turn the train at each end-point. Caltrans is in the process of refitting the cab/coach cars to have a space on the car's lower level for storage for checked luggage and bikes.

Caltrans also owns several Surfliner bi-level cars that are used on some San Joaquins trainsets. The newer cars look very similar to the California Car fleet but feature reclining seats, open overhead luggage racks, and a restroom on the upper level of each car.

In 2007 Caltrans paid to repair several wreck-damaged Superliner I coaches in exchange for a six-year lease of the Amtrak-owned cars that are normally used on long-distance trains. Four of these cars are painted to match the California car livery and often appear in service on the San Joaquins route in place of a coach/baggage car.

Comet Car single-level trainsets

Increasing ridership on the San Joaquins service led Caltrans to purchase 14 Comet IB rail cars from New Jersey Transit in 2008 for $75,000 each. The former commuter cars were refurbished and reconfigured by Amtrak's Beech Grove Shops to serve as intercity coaches at a cost of approximately $20 million. The refurbished cars have reclining inter-city seats with tray tables (4 per row), AmtrakConnect WiFi, two power outlets at each seat pair, luggage racks, trash/recycling bins, a restroom, and 6 workstation tables in the center of the car.

Caltrans has also paid to lease and refurbish 3 Non-Powered Control Units (F40PH locomotives converted into cab/baggage cars) and 3 Horizon Dinettes to serve as café cars (using the same equipment as other Amtrak California trains).

These single-level cars will be used to create two Comet Car trainsets that will run between Oakland and Bakersfield. This will allow Caltrans to break up two bi-level California Car trainsets and use the cars to add another coach car to each of the San Joaquins''' remaining California Car trainsets.

Caltrans had planned to use the Comet Car trainsets on trains starting in July 2013, but the refurbishing process took longer than expected. The first Comet Car trainset was put into regular service on October 21, 2013 and the second trainset was put into regular service on April 15, 2014.

Siemens Venture single-level trainsets

In November 2017, the California Department of Transportation announced that it would be ordering seven Siemens Venture trainsets through its contractor Sumitomo Corporation. The states had initially contracted Sumitomo, which in turn subcontracted with Nippon Sharyo, to build the Next Generation Bi-Level Passenger Rail Car, but a prototype car failed a buff strength test in August 2015. After the test failure, Sumitomo canceled its contract with Nippon Sharyo, and turned to Siemens to be the new subcontractor. The cars are being built at the Siemens factory in Florin, California and will be hauled by California's existing fleet of diesel-electric locomotives.

California's trainsets will be used exclusively on the San Joaquins service and will consist of seven cars each: four coaches with economy seating, two coaches with economy seating and vending machines, and one cab car (control car) with economy seating. The order includes 49 cars for California, formed into seven semi-permanently-coupled trainsets. Since Siemens Venture trainsets were originally designed to be used with high platforms the SJJPA modify all stations, adding two mini-high platforms (short lengths of high platform, each long enough for one door, with an accessible ramp to the longer low platform). The first trainset was supposed to go into revenue service in 2020, though Caltrans only began accepting deliveries of the new rolling stock in late 2022.

Future
In September 2022, CalSTA ordered four hydrogen-powered trainsets from Stadler Rail, with delivery expected in 2027. The trainsets will be used for the Merced–Sacramento portion of the San Joaquins'' after the first segment of California High-Speed Rail begins service. The order includes an option for 25 additional trainsets for Amtrak California services.

References

Notes

External links

San Joaquins website
San Joaquin Joint Powers Authority website

 
Public transportation in Kings County, California
Public transportation in Fresno County, California
Public transportation in Madera County, California
Public transportation in Merced County, California
Public transportation in Stanislaus County, California
Public transportation in San Joaquin County, California
Public transportation in Sacramento County, California
Public transportation in Contra Costa County, California
Public transportation in Alameda County, California
Public transportation in Los Angeles County, California
Public transportation in Southern California
San Joaquin Valley
Amtrak routes
Passenger rail transportation in California
Transportation in Kern County, California
1974 establishments in California